The 1994 Iowa State Senate elections took place as part of the biennial 1994 United States elections. Iowa voters elected state senators in half of the state senate's districts—the 25 odd-numbered state senate districts. State senators serve four-year terms in the Iowa State Senate, with half of the seats up for election each cycle. A statewide map of the 50 state Senate districts in the year 1994 is provided by the Iowa General Assembly here.

The primary election on June 7, 1994 determined which candidates appeared on the November 8, 1994 general election ballot. Primary election results can be obtained here. General election results can be obtained here.

Following the previous election in 1992, Democrats had control of the Iowa state Senate with 27 seats to Republicans' 23 seats.

To take control of the chamber from Democrats, the Republicans needed to net 3 Senate seats.

Democrats kept their control of the Iowa State Senate following the 1994 general election with the balance of power unchanged--Democrats holding 27 seats and Republicans having 23 seats after the election.

Summary of Results
NOTE: The 25 even-numbered districts did not have elections in 1994 so they are not listed here.

Source:

Detailed Results
Reminder: Only odd-numbered Iowa Senate seats were up for election in 1994; therefore, even-numbered seats did not have elections in 1994 & are not shown.

Note: If a district does not list a primary, then that district did not have a competitive primary (i.e., there may have only been one candidate file for that district).

District 1

District 3

District 5

District 7

District 9

District 11

District 13

District 15

District 17

District 19

District 21

District 23

District 25

District 27

District 29

District 31

District 33

District 35

District 37

District 39

District 41

District 43

District 45

District 47

District 49

See also
 United States elections, 1994
 United States House of Representatives elections in Iowa, 1994
 Elections in Iowa

References

1994 Iowa elections
Iowa Senate elections
Iowa State Senate